Peter McCabe (born 5 March 1992) is an Irish rugby union player. He plays as a prop  He previously played for his native province of Munster, Connacht and Bristol Bears. In addition to playing at professional level, McCabe has represented Cork city club Dolphin in club rugby.

Professional career

Munster
McCabe made his competitive debut for Munster when he came on as a substitute against Ospreys in a 2016–17 Pro12 fixture on 4 November 2016, and made his first start for Munster in the Pro12 fixture against Edinburgh on 3 February 2017. However, McCabe left Munster at the end of the 2016–17 season. Following his departure from Connacht after two seasons with the westerners, McCabe returned to Munster to participate in pre-season training on a non-contract basis.

Connacht
McCabe had joined Munster's provincial rivals Connacht on loan in January 2017. By the end of January 2017, he had returned to training with Munster following the completion of his loan. Following his release by Munster, McCabe returned to Connacht permanently on a one-year contract. His contract was extended in March 2018 for a further season. In April 2019, it was announced that McCabe would leave Connacht at the end of the 2018–19 season, having made a total of 37 appearances in his time with the team, however, due to an injury to new signing Paddy McAllister, McCabe returned to Connacht in November 2019 on a short-term contract.

Bristol Bears
McCabe joined English Premiership Rugby side Bristol Bears, where former Connacht coach Pat Lam is in charge, on a short-term deal in August 2020, as front-row injury cover until October 2020. He made his debut for Bristol in their 40–7 defeat against Sale Sharks on 29 August 2020.

In November 2020 it was confirmed he had signed a one-year contract extension for the 2020–21 season.

References

External links
Peter McCabe at Connacht

Peter McCabe at Munster
Peter McCabe at Pro14

Living people
1992 births
People educated at Christian Brothers College, Cork
Rugby union players from County Cork
Irish rugby union players
Dolphin RFC players
Munster Rugby players
Connacht Rugby players
Bristol Bears players
Rugby union props
Irish expatriate rugby union players
Expatriate rugby union players in England
Irish expatriate sportspeople in England
Hartpury University R.F.C. players